The Istana is the official residence and office of the president of Singapore. The palace is open to the public and is where the president receives and entertains state guests.

The Istana is also the office of the prime minister of Singapore and is home to Sri Temasek, the official residence of the prime minister since Singapore's independence in 1965, though none of the prime ministers have ever lived there.

The  estate was once part of the extensive nutmeg plantation of Mount Sophia. In 1867, the British colonial government acquired the land and built a mansion to be the official home of the British governor. This continued until 1959 when Singapore was granted self-government, and the governor was replaced by the Yang di-Pertuan Negara, who was in turn replaced by the president.

History

British Colonial Period

World War II

Post-war
The building continued to be used by governors of the newly created Crown Colony of Singapore. 
When Singapore attained self-rule in 1959, the building was handed over to the Government of Singapore. It was then renamed the Istana. Yusof Ishak was appointed the first local head of state, the Yang di-Pertuan Negara, and took up office at the Istana.

The building was extensively renovated between 1996 and 1998 to add more space and modern-day conveniences. The building today has six function rooms used for ceremonial and entertainment purposes. The offices of the President of Singapore and her staff are in the building.

Present
Since its first occupancy in 1869, the Istana has seen 21 terms of governorship (1869–1959), two terms of occupation by the Yang di-Pertuan Negara (1959–1965) and eight terms of presidential occupation (since 1965), not to mention the Japanese occupancy between 1942 and 1945.

The Istana is the official residence of the President of Singapore. However, no presidents nor cabinet ministers have lived there after the tenure of Devan Nair, the third President of Singapore. The villas, which are meant to be used for foreign heads of state, are used rarely. The Istana building and its grounds are open to the public on five selected statutory holidays – Chinese New Year, Deepavali, Hari Raya Puasa, Labour Day and National Day. Due to the closeness of Deepavali and Hari Raya Puasa in some years, the grounds of the Istana are sometimes open only once during this period in commemoration of both public holidays. The grounds are also often used for state functions and ceremonial occasions such as swearings-in, investitures and the presentation of credentials by heads of foreign missions. The Prime Minister, Senior Minister and Minister Mentor have their offices in the Istana Annex.

On the first Sunday of the month, there is a Changing of the Guards parade, which is a popular public event.

Architecture

The Istana is similar to many 18th-century neo-Palladian style buildings designed by British military engineers in India. It has a tropical layout like a Malay house, surrounded by statuesque columns, deep verandahs, louvred windows and panelled doors to promote cross-ventilation. The central three-storey 28-metre-high tower block dominates the building. The reasonably well-proportioned two-storey side wings feature Ionic, Doric and Corinthian orders with Ionic colonnades at the second storey and Doric colonnades at the first storey. The building sits in its elevated position overlooking its stately grounds, the Domain, reminiscent of the great gardens of England.

Buildings and structures in the grounds
Sri Temasek, also built in 1869 for the Colonial Secretary of the Straits Settlements, has been the official residence of the Prime Minister of Singapore since independence.
The Annexe.
The Istana Villa (1938).
The Lodge (1974).
The Japanese field-artillery gun (a Type 92 10 cm cannon), presented to the leader of the returning victorious British forces to Singapore, Lord Louis Mountbatten, following the official Japanese surrender to the British in 1945 at the end of WWII.
Marsh Garden (1970).
Victoria Pond.
A nine-hole golf course.
A burial place of Bencoolen Muslims who came to Singapore between 1825 and 1828 is located on the southern slopes of the grounds close to the Orchard Road entrance.

Rooms in the main building

First floor
 The Reception Hall is where the president receive visiting dignitaries and foreign heads of state. As its name states, tea receptions are held here after a state dinner.
 In the Banquet Hall, guests dine with the president and are entertained. At the end of the hall is a trompe-l'œil painted with a backdrop of orchids. The room, formerly part of the kitchen and some workshops, is also used to display state gifts.
 The State Room is the seat and office of the president. The hall is used for events such as the swearing-in of a newly-elected Cabinet members or President, or for presentations of awards. When it was the sitting room of Sir Shenton Thomas, he had a statue of Queen Victoria at one end of the room. The statue was later removed to make way for what is now the Presidential Chair and two flags: the State Flag and the Presidential Standard. The statue of Queen Victoria now stands at the end of the Victoria Pond located south of the Istana Grounds.

Second floor
 The Reception Room is a small parlour on the second floor leading to the East and West Sitting Rooms. It is where the president holds discussions with foreign dignitaries.
 The East Sitting Room features a collection of state gifts, including a set of chinaware made in France and presented to President Benjamin Sheares which is displayed in a bulletproof glass case.
 The West Sitting Room is a parlour that has been the setting for many interviews with heads of state and Members of Parliament. The room is laid with original timber flooring from the 1930s. Displayed on the walls of the room are priceless replicas of Arab tapestry presented by the Sultan of Oman to President Ong Teng Cheong in the 1990s.
 The Sheares Room is a private dining hall named after President Benjamin Sheares, the second president of Singapore. It is used by the president and their family or, in some cases, the Cabinet members. Name cards indicating the sitting positions of each person are printed and gold-plated by Risis. Besides the unique boat-shaped dining table in the room, seven painted panels depicting the seven presidents and their respective Cabinet members hang on the right of the room.
 The Yusof Room is named for the first president of Singapore, Yusof Ishak; his bust sits at the end of this parlour. The room features a large Chinese-style panel painted with phoenixes and peonies.

Mezzanine floor
The U-shaped Grand Staircase leads to the second and third floors of the Istana. On the first landing stands the Guardian of the House on a raised display cabinet. The  statue is made of wood from India, ivory and mother of pearl. The Guardian was made by Indian labourers who constructed the Istana and was presented to Sir Shenton Thomas to commemorate his taking up of residence there. During the Second World War, the statue was placed in a storeroom. It was forgotten until 1995 when Istana guards were tasked to clear the storeroom, at which time it was found lying next to the British coat of arms which used to hang at the main entrance to the Istana.

Third floor
 Despite the name of the President's Lounge, it also serves as the main balcony of the Istana which overlooks the ceremonial square and lawn on the ground floor. The room is styled like the White House's Blue Room, which also overlooks the White House lawn. Facing this lounge is the office of the president.
 The Office of the President of Singapore, which is out of bounds to the public, has four main pieces of furniture: a maroon sofa for guests to rest on, the main office desk made out of wood, a cowhide office chair, and a wooden side desk.

See also
 The Prime Minister's Office, based in the Istana.
 Istana Kampong Glam, former palace of the Sultan of Singapore.
 History of Singapore
 Timeline of Singaporean history
 Government Houses of the British Empire and Commonwealth
 Similar British Malayan colonial residences:
 Governor's residence in Malacca.
 Suffolk House and The Residency in Penang.
 Carcosa in Kuala Lumpur.

References

.
.

Further reading
.
.
.
.
.
.
.

External links

Istana Singapore – Office of the President of the Republic of Singapore

Government buildings in Singapore
Houses in Singapore
Government Houses of the British Empire and Commonwealth
Houses completed in 1869
Protected areas of Singapore
National monuments of Singapore
Orchard, Singapore
Official residences
Official residences in Singapore
Orchard Road
Presidential residences
Presidents of Singapore
Tourist attractions in Singapore
1869 establishments in the British Empire
19th-century architecture in Singapore